Henry Hucks Gibbs, 1st Baron Aldenham MA BA FGS FSA (31 August 1819 – 13 September 1907) was a British banker, businessman and Conservative Party politician.

Life
Aldenham was the son of George Henry Gibbs,
whose father Antony Gibbs was a brother of Sir Vicary Gibbs, a Chief Justice of the Common Pleas. He matriculated at Exeter College, Oxford in 1837, graduating B.A. in 1841, M.A. in 1844.

Gibbs was a senior partner in the family firm of Antony Gibbs & Sons, and was a director of the Bank of England from 1853 to 1901, its deputy governor, and finally its Governor from 1875 to 1877.

He was elected as a Member of Parliament (MP) for the City of London at an unopposed by-election in April 1891,
and held the seat until the general election in July 1892, when his oldest son Alban was elected in his place.
He also held the office of High Sheriff of Hertfordshire in 1884.
In 1896 he was raised to the peerage as Baron Aldenham, of Aldenham in the County of Hertford. A member of the Philological Society, he was a major benefactor to the Oxford English Dictionary.

Family
Lord Aldenham married Louisa Anne, daughter of William Adams and Mary Anne Cokayne, in 1845. Their fourth son, Herbert Cokayne Gibbs, was created Baron Hunsdon of Hunsdon in 1923 while their fifth son Kenneth Francis Gibbs was Archdeacon of St Albans. Lady Aldenham died in 1897. Lord Aldenham survived her by ten years and died in September 1907, aged 88. He was succeeded in the barony by his eldest son Alban.

Children of Lord and Lady Aldenham:
Alban Gibbs, 2nd Baron Aldenham 1846–1936
Edith Caroline Gibbs 1848–1942
Walter Antony Gibbs 1850–1858
Vicary Gibbs 1853–1932
Herbert Gibbs, 1st Baron Hunsdon 1854–1935
Kenneth Francis Gibbs 1856–1935
Henry Lloyd Gibbs 1861–1907

References

Sources 

Kidd, Charles, Williamson, David (editors). Debrett's Peerage and Baronetage (1990 edition). New York: St Martin's Press, 1990.
Henry Hucks Gibbs at ThePeerage.com

External links 
 
  

1819 births
1907 deaths
Fellows of the Society of Antiquaries of London
High Sheriffs of Hertfordshire
Conservative Party (UK) MPs for English constituencies
Gibbs, Hucks
UK MPs who were granted peerages
Governors of the Bank of England
Members of Parliament of the United Kingdom for the City of London
Deputy Governors of the Bank of England
Hucks
People from Aldenham
Hucks
Peers of the United Kingdom created by Queen Victoria
19th-century English businesspeople